San Giusto (L 9894) is a  of the Italian Navy. The ship was built by Fincantieri-Cantieri Navali SpA at Riva Trigoso, laid down on 19 August 1991, and launched on 23 October 1993.

Operations

 1997: Operation Alba, during the Albanian Civil War
 1999/2000: the ship was deployed to East Timor as part of the Australian-led INTERFET peacekeeping taskforce from 26 October 1999 to 15 February 2000.
 2003: Operation Ancient Babylon/Operation Iraqi Freedom, support to Italian and coalition forces in Iraq
 June 2005: San Giusto was the flagship of Admiral Jonathon Band RN, during "Exercise Sorbet Royal", a NATO exercise in which ships from ten countries carried out simulated rescues from submerged submarines.
 2008: DEEP BLUE/LONG KNIFE international exercise
 2009: LOYAL MARINER 09 international exercise
 2011: Operation Unified Protector, to support Libya coalition campaign 
 2012: flagship of Task Force Atalanta in Indian Ocean for anti-piracy rules  
 2014: Operation Mare Nostrum, to rescue refugees in Mediterranean Sea.

References

External links
 Amphibious ship San Giusto Marina Militare website

1993 ships
San Giorgio-class amphibious transport docks
Ships built by Fincantieri
Ships built in Italy